Palti may refer to:
Palti, son of Laish, a biblical figure associated with David's wife Michal
Palti, son of Raphu, a minor biblical figure in the Book of Numbers